Monaghan was a constituency represented in the Irish House of Commons until 1800. Between 1725 and 1793 Catholics and those married to Catholics could not vote.

Members of Parliament

References

Historic constituencies in County Monaghan
Constituencies of the Parliament of Ireland (pre-1801)
1800 disestablishments in Ireland
Constituencies disestablished in 1800